Otto M. Peterson was a member of the Minnesota House of Representatives from 1917 to 1918. He was born on May 4, 1877 in Cashton, Wisconsin.

References

People from Monroe County, Wisconsin
Members of the Minnesota House of Representatives
1877 births
Year of death missing